Vladimir Pavićević (born 26 February 1977) is a Serbian former professional tennis player.

Pavićević grew up in the Serbian city of Novi Sad and played collegiate tennis in the United States, first for the University of South Carolina, then the University of Nevada, Las Vegas. His Davis Cup career for Yugoslavia included singles wins against Justin Bower and Louis Vosloo, to secure a tie over South Africa in Belgrade in 2002. In 2004 he won three ITF Futures singles titles and attained his career best ranking of 329 in the world.

ITF Futures finals

Singles: 6 (3–3)

Doubles: 1 (0–1)

See also
List of Serbia Davis Cup team representatives

References

External links
 
 
 

1977 births
Living people
Serbian male tennis players
Serbia and Montenegro male tennis players
South Carolina Gamecocks men's tennis players
UNLV Rebels athletes
Sportspeople from Novi Sad